Mount Maclure is the nearest neighbor to Mount Lyell, the highest point in Yosemite National Park. Mount Maclure is the fifth-highest mountain of Yosemite. The summit is on the boundary between Madera and Tuolumne counties, which is also the boundary between the park and the Ansel Adams Wilderness. It was named in honor of William Maclure, a pioneer in American geology who produced the first geological maps of the United States. Maclure Glacier, one of the last remaining glaciers in Yosemite, is situated on the mountain's northern flank.

See also

 Rodgers Peak (California)
 Simmons Peak

References 

Mountains of Yosemite National Park
Mountains of the Ansel Adams Wilderness
Mountains of Madera County, California
Mountains of Tuolumne County, California